Marriage in Germany is governed by the Bürgerliches Gesetzbuch  in sections 1297 to 1588 of the fourth book of the code as a branch of family law. Marriage may only be conducted by a civil registrar, although couples may also participate in religious ceremonies. People who are not citizens or residents may marry in Germany. Since 1 October 2017, same-sex couples may marry.

References

External links